Gulotta is an Italian surname. Notable people with the surname include:

Frank Gulotta (1907–1989), American judge and lawyer
Guglielmo Gulotta (born 1939), Italian academic
Loreta Gulotta (born 1987), Italian fencer
Thomas Gulotta (1944-2019), American politician and lawyer
Tony Gulotta (1903–1981), American racing driver

Italian-language surnames